Modunda aeneiceps is a species of spider of the genus Modunda. It is found only in China and Sri Lanka.

References

Salticidae
Spiders of Asia
Spiders described in 1901